Pachycauls are plants with a disproportionately thick trunk for their height, and few branches. This can be the product of exceptional primary growth (as with palms and cycads) or disproportioate secondary growth as with Adansonia. The word is derived from the Greek pachy- meaning thick or stout, and Latin caulis meaning the stem. All of the tree (and treelike) species of cactus are pachycauls, as are most palms, Cycads and pandans. The largest caudex type pachycaul is the African Baobab (Adansonia digitata). This tree suffered a severe trauma and is dying.

Examples occur in the genera
Pachycormus (Anacardiaceae)
Adenium
Pachypodium (Apocynaceae)
Dendrosenecio (Asteraceae)
Bursera (Burseraceae)
Cyanea
Lobelia (Campanulaceae)
Dendrosicyos (Cucurbitaceae)
Givotia (Euphorbiaceae)
Delonix (Fabaceae)
Fouquieria (Fouquieriaceae)
Adansonia
Bombax
Brachychiton
Cavanillesia
Ceiba (Malvaceae)
Dorstenia (Moraceae)
Cyphostemma (Vitaceae).

See also
 Caudex

References

Plant morphology
Plant anatomy